Regilio Benito Tuur (born 12 August 1967) is a former Dutch boxer who was World Boxing Organization's super featherweight champion.

Prior to turning professional and winning the world title, Tuur knocked out reigning world champion Kelcie Banks in the first round at the 1988 Summer Olympics in Seoul.

Amateur career

After winning a bronze medal at the 1987 European Amateur Boxing Championships, Tuur was selected to participate at the Olympics.

His 1988 Olympic Results as a featherweight are:
Defeated Kelcie Banks, USA KO 1
Defeated John Wanjau, Kenya 4-1
Defeated David Anderson, Great Britain RSC 2
Lost to Daniel Dumitrescu, Romania 0-5 (quarterfinals)

Professional career
In 1989, Tuur turned professional with his first fight held in New York. In 1994, he won the world title of the World Boxing Organization (WBO) by beating Eugene Speed from the United States in his hometown Rotterdam.
He lived in Hempstead, Long Island for several years with his wife and daughter.

Professional boxing record

References

External links
 
 sports-reference

1967 births
Living people
Olympic boxers of the Netherlands
Boxers at the 1988 Summer Olympics
Surinamese emigrants to the Netherlands
Sportspeople from Paramaribo
Boxers from Rotterdam
Lightweight boxers
Featherweight boxers
Super-featherweight boxers
World super-featherweight boxing champions
Dutch male boxers
Surinamese male boxers
World Boxing Organization champions
European Boxing Union champions